The 1951 NFL Championship Game was the National Football League's 19th championship game, played December 23 at the Los Angeles Memorial Coliseum in Los Angeles, California.

It was a rematch of the previous year's game in Cleveland, with the Los Angeles Rams (8–4) of the National Conference meeting the defending league champion Cleveland Browns (11–1) of the American Conference. In the league championship game for the third straight year, the Rams were seeking their first NFL title since moving to California in early 1946 (the Cleveland Rams won the 1945 title, then left a month later). The Browns were favored to win this title game on the road by six points.

This was the first NFL championship game to be televised coast-to-coast, and was blacked out by the league in the southern California area. The DuMont Network purchased the championship game TV rights from the NFL in May for five years (1951–55) for $475,000.

The home underdog Rams upset the Browns 24–17 for their second NFL championship before a then-record crowd for the title game of 59,475. The "World Championship" banner awarded to the Rams was given as a gift to Tom Bergin after the game in gratitude for hosting the post-game dinner. As of 2016 it still hangs in the Tom Bergin's Irish pub in Los Angeles, the only one in private ownership. This was also the first time that the Browns under Paul Brown did not finish the season with a championship after 4 wins in the AAFC and a championship in their first NFL season in 1950.

This was the Rams' only NFL championship as a California team until their victory in Super Bowl LVI against the Cincinnati Bengals, which is coincidentally the team founded by Brown. The Rams won their first NFL championship during their final season in Cleveland, and also won Super Bowl XXXIV during their fifth season in St. Louis.

Game summary
The Rams were the first to score, with a 1-yard run by fullback Dick Hoerner in the second quarter. The Browns answered back with an NFL Championship record 52-yard field goal by Lou Groza. They later took the lead with a 17-yard touchdown pass from Otto Graham to Dub Jones, and the Browns led at halftime, 10–7.

In the third quarter, Ram Larry Brink landed a hard tackle on Graham, causing him to fumble the ball, which Andy Robustelli picked up on the Cleveland 24 and returned it to the two-yard-line. On third down from the one, "Deacon" Dan Towler ran the ball in for a touchdown to give the Rams a 14–10 lead.

Early in the fourth quarter, the Rams increased their lead with a 17-yard field goal by former local UCLA great Bob Waterfield. The Browns answered back with an 8-play, 70-yard drive that ended with a 5-yard touchdown run by Ken Carpenter to tie the game at 17–17. 

Twenty-five seconds later, Tom Fears beat defenders Cliff Lewis and Tommy James, and received a Norm Van Brocklin pass at midfield and raced to the end zone for a 73-yard touchdown. It secured the first NFL title in Los Angeles. Their second title in Los Angeles came in February 2022

The next NFL title for the franchise came 48 years later, when the St. Louis Rams won Super Bowl XXXIV in January 2000.

Scoring summary
Sunday, December 23, 1951
Kickoff: 1:05 p.m. PST

First quarter
 no scoring
Second quarter
LA   – TD, Dick Hoerner 1 run (Bob Waterfield kick), 7–0 LA
CLE – FG, Lou Groza 52, 7–3 LA
CLE – TD, Dub Jones 17 pass from Otto Graham (Groza kick), 10–7 CLE
Third quarter
LA   – TD, Dan Towler 1 run (Waterfield kick), 14–10 LA
Fourth quarter
LA   – FG, Waterfield 17, 17–10 LA
CLE – TD, Ken Carpenter 5 run (Groza kick), 17–17 tie
LA   – TD, Tom Fears 73 pass from Norm Van Brocklin (Waterfield kick), 24–17 LA

Officials

Referee: Ronald Gibbs
Umpire: Samuel Wilson
Head Linesman: Dan Tehan
Back Judge: Norman Duncan
Field Judge: Lloyd Brazil

Alternate: Emil Heintz
Alternate: Cletus Gardner 

Players' shares
The gross receipts for the game, including $75,000 for radio and television rights, was just under $326,000, the highest to date, passing the previous record of $283,000 five years earlier in 1946. Each player on the winning Rams team received $2,108, while Browns players made $1,483 each.

References

Bibliography
 NFL Chronology: 1951. NFL.com. Retrieved September 17, 2006.
 Brown, Paul; with Clary, Jack (1979). PB, the Paul Brown Story. New York: Atheneum.
 Hession, Joseph (1987). The Rams: Five Decades of Football. San Francisco: Foghorn Press.
 MacCambridge, Michael (2005). America's Game. New York: Anchor Books 
 Powers, Ron (1984). Supertube: The Rise of Television Sports. New York: Coward-McCann. 
 Rader, Benjamin G. (1984). In its Own Image: How Television Has Transformed Sports. New York: The Free Press.  pp. 83–99.
 Riffenburgh, Beau, (1997). "Championships & Playoffs." Eds Silverman, Matthew, et al. Total Football II: The Official Encyclopedia of the National Football League. New York: HarperCollins. 178–262. 
 

Championship Game, 1951
National Football League Championship games
Cleveland Browns postseason
Los Angeles Rams postseason
December 1951 sports events in the United States
1951 in sports in Ohio
Sports competitions in Cleveland